Boris (real name : Philippe Dhondt, born on May 19, 1965, in Roubaix, France) is a French singer, songwriter, composer and radio host on Radio Galaxie (a radio in Nord-Pas-de-Calais). He participated in many dance projects and remains particularly famous for having created the character of Boris in the late 1990s, which had huge success with the top three hit singles "Soirée disco" and "Miss Camping", and for his hit "Le Dormeur", a top ten hit in France, recorded when he was member of Pleasure Game band, in 1991. He received ten Gold discs during the 1990s in Benelux.

Discography

Albums
 1996 : Boris: 18 Rêves, 18 Visions - #6 in France, Gold
 1996 : Cyber Boris
 1999 : Dj Xam & Boris: L'album
 2004 : Le Carnaval des Fracassés (under the name Boris Team)

Singles

As Pleasure Game

As Boris

With DJ Xam

References

1965 births
Living people
People from Roubaix
French male singers
French singer-songwriters
French male singer-songwriters